2010 Czech Lion Awards ceremony was held on 5 March 2011.

Winners and nominees

Non-statutory Awards

References

2010 film awards
Czech Lion Awards ceremonies